Lilies of the Field is a 1963 American comedy drama film adapted by James Poe from the 1962 novel of the same name by William Edmund Barrett, and stars Sidney Poitier, Lilia Skala, Stanley Adams, and Dan Frazer. It was produced and directed by Ralph Nelson. The title comes from the Sermon on the Mount in the Bible (Matthew 6:27–33 and its parallel scripture from Luke 12:27–31). It features an early film score by prolific composer Jerry Goldsmith. The film was turned into a Broadway musical in 1970, retitled Look to the Lilies, with Shirley Booth in the role of Mother Maria Marthe.

It tells the story of an itinerant worker who encounters a group of East German nuns, who believe he has been sent to them by God to build them a new chapel.

It was praised by critics and received numerous accolades, including five Academy Award nominations, including Best Picture and Best Supporting Actress for Skala. Poitier won the Academy Award for Best Actor, becoming the first person of color to win an Academy Award for a leading role and the second person-of-color to win after Hattie McDaniel won for Best Supporting Actress for Gone with the Wind.

In 2020, the film was selected for preservation in the United States National Film Registry by the Library of Congress as being "culturally, historically, or aesthetically significant".

Plot
Homer Smith is an itinerant jack-of-all-trades who stops at a farm in the Arizona desert to obtain some water for his car. There he sees several women working on a fence, very ineptly. The women, who speak very little English, introduce themselves as German, Austrian and Hungarian nuns. The mother superior, the leader of the nuns, persuades him to do a small roofing repair. Instead of paying him and letting him continue on his way, they invite him to stay to dinner, where all speak in German. They all call him "Schmidt" the German equivalent of Smith. He teaches them some more English and they all have fun.

He stays overnight, assuming that he will be paid in the next morning. Next day, he is given a frugal breakfast and mother superior shows him a broken structure and says she wants him to build a chapel. He resists and just wants pay.

Smith tries to persuade the mother superior to pay him by quoting Luke 10:7, "The laborer is worthy of his hire." Mother Maria Marthe (called Mother Maria) responds by asking him to read another Bible verse from the Sermon on the Mount: "Consider the lilies of the field, how they grow; they toil not, neither do they spin. And yet I say unto you that even Solomon in all his glory was not arrayed like one of these.”

When Sunday comes, Mother Maria informs Smith that he will drive the sisters to Mass in his station wagon. (The nuns have no vehicle and thus ordinarily would walk the long distance to church.) Smith is invited to attend the Catholic Mass, celebrated by a roving priest not in a church but outdoors, but he declines because he is a Baptist. Instead, he takes the opportunity to get a proper breakfast from the trading post next door. In talking to the proprietor, Juan, Smith learns about the hardships that the nuns, led by the unyielding Mother Maria, overcame to emigrate from Eastern Europe—over the Berlin Wall—only to scratch out a meager living on the farm that was willed to their order. Juan humorously tells Homer that he considers prayer and belief in religion a form of "insurance", and suggests that that is why Homer is helping the nuns without payment. The priest confides in Homer that the nuns have no money but says the nuns told him that Smith will build a chapel.

Mother Maria likes things done her way. The nuns have essentially no money and subsist by living off the land, on what vegetables the arid climate provides, and some milk and eggs. Even after being stonewalled when asking for payment, Smith, persuaded to stay for a meal, agrees, against his better judgment, to stay another day to help them with other small jobs, always with the faint hope that Mother Maria will pay him for his work.

On the day Smith plans to leave they ask for a lift to town to a building supplier.  The owner and contractor, Ashton, has donated materials to the nuns but is wary of being sucked in by the Mother’s persuasiveness. He calls Smith over, calling Homer "boy". He ridicules the nuns saying that Smith might build a chapel. Smith turns it round, calling the contractor “boy” so the audience understands the initial racial slur involved. He offers to work with the contractor operating the earth moving equipment. When asked what he will do on the other three days, he says he will be building a chapel.

As Smith's skills and strengths become apparent to the nuns, they come to believe that he has been sent by God to fulfill their dream of building a chapel for the townsfolk—who are Mexican American and impoverished—as the nearest church is miles away.

He spends his own money to buy better food in the supermarket and gives it to the nuns.

Though he has come to realize how unlikely it is that he will be paid, and partly out of respect for all the women have overcome, Smith stays longer and finds himself driven to work at least on clearing the construction site for the chapel. He rationalizes that it would be too hard for the sisters to move the heavy beams. After losing another duel of Bible quotes with Mother Maria, Smith acknowledges that he has always wanted to be an architect, but couldn't afford the schooling. His unfulfilled dream impels him to agree to undertake the (unpaid) job of building the sisters a chapel.

To pass the evenings, Smith (whom the nuns call "Schmidt") helps the sisters improve their rudimentary English (only Mother Maria speaks the language well enough to converse with him) and joins them in singing. They share their different musical traditions with one another: their Catholic chants and his Baptist hymns. He teaches them to join him in the call-and-response song "Amen" by Jester Hairston (dubbed by Hairston in the film).

One evening Smith argues with mother superior who asks why he buys food when they need bricks. He accuses her of being like Hitler. He disappears for three weeks. He returns with a hangover and a jazzy shirt, but the nuns are happy to see him. The locals start to contribute materials. However they just watch him building rather than helping. They call him the "Americano". Then, starting with Juan, the cafe owner, they start to help. Things start to go wrong as no-one is in overall charge. Smith is put in charge and also starts organising the nuns to make their own adobe bricks to save money.

Smith, determined that the building will be constructed to the highest standards, insists that the work be done by him and only him. Meanwhile, the nuns write letters to various philanthropic organizations and charities asking for money for supplies, but all their requests are denied. As word spreads about the endeavor, locals begin to show up to contribute materials and to help in construction, but Smith rebuffs all offers of assistance in the labor. As he gains a larger and larger audience for his efforts, the locals, impressed with his determination, but no less dogged than he, will content themselves no longer with just watching. They find ways to lend a hand that Smith cannot easily turn down—the lifting of a bucket or brick, for example. Once the process is in motion, they end up doing as they intended, assisting in every aspect of the construction, as well as contributing materials. This greatly accelerates the progress, much to the delight of everyone but Smith.

Even Ashton, who has long ignored Mother Maria's pleas, finds an excuse to deliver some more materials. Almost overnight, Smith finds that he's become a building foreman and contractor. Enduring the hassles of coordinating the work of so many, the constant disputes with Mother Maria, and the trial of getting enough materials for the building, Smith brings the chapel to completion, placing the cross on the spire himself and signing his work where only he and God will know. Ashton offers Homer a job as foreman on a new road project, calling him Mr Smith, acknowledging the proper respect Homer deserves. Homer declines but mutual respect is evident as Homer calls him Mr Ashton.

On the evening before the Sunday when the chapel is to be dedicated, all the work has been done and Smith is exhausted. Now that there is nothing more to keep Smith among them, Mother Maria, too proud to ask him outright to stay, insists that he attend the opening Mass next day to receive proper recognition from the congregation. She speaks enthusiastically of all that "Schmidt" still can do to aid the town, such as building a school. Making no reply to any of this, Smith tricks Mother Maria, as part of the night's English lesson, into saying "thank you" to him. Until then, she stubbornly had thanked only God for the work, assistance, and gifts that Smith had provided to the nuns. It is a touching moment between two strong personalities.

Later that evening, as he leads the nuns in singing "Amen" once again, Smith slips out the door and, still singing the lead, the nuns' voices chiming softly behind him, takes one last look at the chapel he built. Mother Maria hears him start up his station wagon, but remains stolidly in her seat, singing along with the rest of the sisters, as Smith drives quietly off into the night.

Instead of the usual "The End" credit, the film closes with "Amen."

Cast

Production
The movie was filmed on the northern edge (near Sabino Canyon and Cloud Road) of Tucson. The church doors were borrowed from the Chapel in Sasabe, Arizona and were carved by local Tucson artist Charles Bolsius.

Jester Hairston, who wrote the gospel arrangement of Amen used in the film and who arranged the vocal parts, dubbed the vocals for Poitier, who was tone-deaf.

Release
The film was screened in competition at the 1963 Berlin Film Festival in June 1963. It opened October 3, 1963 at the Murray Hill Theater in New York City.

 Reception 
  Variety said it was a film "loaded with charm and which is full of good, clean, honest fun."

Awards and honors

Sidney Poitier became the first African-American actor to win the Academy Award for Best Actor and the second African-American Oscar winner overall (after Hattie McDaniel won the Academy Award for Best Supporting Actress for Gone with the Wind in 1939).

Also, the film is recognized by American Film Institute in these lists:
 2003: AFI's 100 Years...100 Heroes & Villains:
 Homer Smith – Nominated Hero
 2006: AFI's 100 Years...100 Cheers – #46

Sequel
The sequel Christmas Lilies of the Field was made in 1979 for television in which Homer Smith (now played by Billy Dee Williams), returns and is "persuaded” to build a kindergarten for a group of orphans and runaways whom the sisters have taken in.

See also

 List of American films of 1963
 Loretto Chapel

 References 
Informational notesCitations'

External links
 
 
 
 
 

1963 films
1963 drama films
American black-and-white films
American drama films
Films about Catholic nuns
Films about Catholicism
Films based on American novels
Films directed by Ralph Nelson
Films featuring a Best Actor Academy Award-winning performance
Films featuring a Best Drama Actor Golden Globe winning performance
Films scored by Jerry Goldsmith
Films set in Pima County, Arizona
Films shot in Arizona
Films with screenplays by James Poe
United Artists films
United States National Film Registry films
1960s English-language films
1960s American films